This is a List of clubs in the Landesliga Bayern-Nord, including all clubs and their final placings from the first season in 1963–64 to 2010–11. The league, commonly referred to as the Landesliga Nord, is the second-highest football league in the state of Bavaria and the Bavarian football league system. It is one of three Landesligas in Bavarian football, the sixth tier of the German football league system. Until the introduction of the 3. Liga in 2008 it was the fifth tier.

Overview
Since the formation of the league in 1963, it has served as the tier below the Bayernliga, together with the central and the southern division of the Landesliga. Originally a tier-four league, it was demoted to tier-five status in 1994, when the Regionalligas were introduced. In 2008, it was then demoted to tier-six status, when the 3. Liga was established.

Originally, the Bezirksligas were the feeder leagues to the Landesliga Süd, of which there were, for the most part, four, two each in Upper and Lower Franconia. From 1988, Bezirksoberligas served as feeder leagues instead, having been established as a new tier between the Landesligas and the Bezirksligas. The two leagues below the Landesliga Nord have since been the Bezirksoberliga Unterfranken and the Bezirksoberliga Oberfranken.

Clubs and their placings
The complete list of clubs and placings in the league since the introduction of the league in 1963:

1963–1988
The first 25 seasons from 1963 to 1988:

1988–2012
The last 24 seasons from 1988 to 2012:

Key

 S = No of seasons in league (as of 2011–12)

Notes
 1 In 1981, FV Würzburg 04 folded and reformed as Würzburger FV.
 2 In 1982, the SpVgg Bayreuth II withdrew from the league because the club's first team was relegated to the Bayernliga.
 3 In 1992, the FC Bayern Alzenau withdrew from the league and joined the Landesliga Hessen-Süd instead. In 2009, the club earned promotion to the Regionalliga.
 4 In 1997, the VfB Helmbrechts withdrew from the Bayernliga to the lower amateur leagues.
 5 In 2003, the TSV Gerbrunn withdrew from the Bayernliga to the lower amateur leagues.
 6 In 2007, the SV Aschaffenburg-Damm withdrew from the league.
 7 In 2000, VfB Coburg merged with DJK/Viktoria Coburg to form DVV Coburg. In 2011, the new club became insolvent and will be disbanded on 30 June 2012.
 8 In 2006, the 1. FC Bamberg merged with TSV Eintracht Bamberg to form 1. FC Eintracht Bamberg. The club became insolvent in 2010, folded, reformed as FC Eintracht Bamberg 2010 and continued playing in the Bayernliga. The reserve team however withdrew from the Landesliga.
 9 In 2005, the FC Bayern Hof merged with SpVgg Hof to form SpVgg Bayern Hof. League placings for SpVgg Hof are shown separately while placings for FC and SpVgg Bayern Hof are combined.
 10 In 2003, 1. FC Bayreuth and BSV 98 Bayreuth merged to form FSV Bayreuth. BSV 98 Bayreuth itself had been formed in a merger of VfB Bayreuth and TuSpo Bayreuth in 1968.
 11 In 1974, the SC Kreuzwertheim disbanded its football department.
 12 In 1972, the TSV Mainaschaff withdrew from the league.
 13 In 1965, the SV Großwallstadt withdrew from the league.

References

Sources
 Die Bayernliga 1945 – 1997,  published by the DSFS, 1998
 Deutschlands Fußball in Zahlen,  An annual publication with tables and results from the Bundesliga to Verbandsliga/Landesliga, publisher: DSFS
 Süddeutschlands Fussballgeschichte in Tabellenform 1897–1988  History of Southern German football in tables, publisher & author: Ludolf Hyll
 50 Jahre Bayrischer Fussball-Verband  50-year-anniversary book of the Bavarian FA, publisher: Vindelica Verlag, published: 1996

External links 
 Bayrischer Fussball Verband (Bavarian FA) 
 Das deutsche Fussball Archiv Historic German league tables 
 Bavarian League tables and results 
 Website with tables and results from the Bavarian Oberliga to Bezirksliga 

Nord
2